Nicolai Feopemptovich Soloviev (Russian: Никола́й Феопе́мптович Соловьёв; Petrozavodsk, 9 May [O.S. 27 April] 1846 – 27 December [O.S. 14 December] 1916 in  Petrograd (Saint Petersburg)), sometimes Solovyov, was a Russian music critic, composer, and teacher at the Saint Petersburg Conservatory. His notable composition students include Samuel Maykapar, Mihkel Lüdig, Artur Lemba, and Peeter Süda.  Soloviev composed several operas, an overture, and the symphonic poem Russians and Mongols, and assisted in the completion of Alexander Serov's opera, The Power of the Fiend.

As a music critic, Soloviev supported the works of composers such as Modest Mussorgsky and Nikolai Rimsky-Korsakov, while trouncing the work of other composers. Of Pyotr Ilyich Tchaikovsky's First Piano Concerto he wrote, "Tchaikovsky's First Piano Concerto, like the first pancake, is a flop."

References

External links

Soloviev, Nikolai (Feopemptovich) at www.encyclopedia.com

1846 births
1916 deaths
Pupils of Nikolai Zaremba
Saint Petersburg Conservatory alumni
Russian Romantic composers
Russian male classical composers
Russian music critics
20th-century Russian male musicians
19th-century male musicians
Burials at Nikolskoe Cemetery
Academic staff of Saint Petersburg Conservatory